Ben Sakoguchi (born 1938) is a Japanese-American artist who was born in San Bernardino, California.  At age five, his family was interned at the Poston War Relocation Center in Arizona following the enforcement of Executive Order 9066.

Education 
In 1960, Sakoguchi earned a Bachelor of Fine Arts from the University of California, Los Angeles. In 1964, Sakoguchi earned a Master of Fine Arts degree from University of California, Los Angeles.

Career 
Sakoguchi was an art instructor at Pasadena City College from 1964 until his retirement in 1997.

Sakoguchi is best known for his small paintings that were created in series, often with socially relevant themes, such as slavery and the internment of Japanese Americans. Sakoguchi is known for his Orange Crate Label series. Aphrodisiac Brand, in the collection of the Honolulu Museum of Art, is a mock orange-crate label.  Is shows a rhinoceros slaughtered for its horn, which is erroneously believed to be an aphrodisiac or a cure for cancer in Traditional Chinese Medicine as Cornu Rhinoceri Asiatici (犀角, xījiǎo, "rhinoceros horn").  The Art Institute of Chicago, the Brooklyn Museum, the Columbia Museum of Art (Columbia, SC), the Honolulu Museum of Art, the Fogg Art Museum (Cambridge, Massachusetts), the Museum of Modern Art (New York City), the Philadelphia Museum of Art, the Queensland Art Gallery (Brisbane, Australia), and the Smithsonian American Art Museum are among the public collections holding work by Ben Sakoguchi.

References 

1938 births
20th-century American painters
American artists of Japanese descent
Japanese-American internees
Living people
Pasadena City College faculty
University of California, Los Angeles alumni
21st-century American painters
People from San Bernardino, California